Solitude is a US compilation album by The The consisting of the two UK EPs Disinfected and Shades of Blue. In addition a remix of "The Violence of Truth" from a limited edition version of the "Dogs of Lust" single is included.

Track listing

"That Was The Day"
"Dis-Infected"
"Jealous of Youth"
"The Violence of Truth" (Remix)
"Helpline Operator" (Sick Boy mix)
"Another Boy Drowning" (live)
"Solitude"
"Dolphins"
"Dogs of Lust" (Germicide Mix)

References

The The albums
1994 compilation albums
Epic Records compilation albums